Craig David Parry (born 12 January 1966) is an Australian professional golfer. He has been one of Australia's premier golfers since turning professional in 1985, and has 23 career victories, two of those wins being events on the PGA Tour; the 2002 WGC-NEC Invitational and the 2004 Ford Championship at Doral.

Career as professional golfer
His first career victory came at the 1987 New South Wales Open, (an event he later won again in 1992) and later that year won the Canadian TPC. In 1992 he won three of Australia's top four tournaments, placing first at the Australian PGA Championship, New South Wales Open and the Australian Masters, a tournament he has won three times (in 1992, 1994 and 1996).

Parry first came to the attention of American golf fans during the 1992 Masters Tournament. After finishing tied for 11th in the 1991 U.S. Open, he qualified for the following year's Masters. Parry shared the lead after 36 holes and took sole possession after the third round. However, on Sunday he faltered and finished the tourney tied for 13th.

He won six events on the European Tour, the latest being his play-off victory over fellow Australian Nick O'Hern at the 2005 Heineken Classic, an event which had been dominated by South African superstar Ernie Els the preceding three years. He played the European Tour on a regular basis from 1988 to 1991 and had two top-10 finishes on the Order of Merit: third in 1989 and fifth in 1991. From 1992 until 2006 he played mainly on the PGA Tour, while continuing to compete around the world. Since 2007 he has concentrated on playing the Japan Golf Tour and PGA Tour of Australasia. He has featured in the top 50 of the Official World Golf Ranking.

National team participation
He has been an integral part of Australian national teams and has been a member of the International Team in three Presidents Cups: 1994, 1996, and 1998. He won the PGA Tour of Australasia's Order of Merit in 1995, 2002 and 2007.

Personal life
Parry was born in Sunshine, Victoria. Parry is married with three children, and divides his time between Sydney, Australia and Orlando, Florida.

Professional wins (23)

PGA Tour wins (2)

PGA Tour playoff record (1–0)

European Tour wins (6)

1Co-sanctioned by the PGA Tour of Australasia

European Tour playoff record (3–0)

Japan Golf Tour wins (2)

Asian Tour wins (1)

PGA Tour of Australasia wins (12)

1Co-sanctioned by the European Tour

PGA Tour of Australasia playoff record (2–4)

Canadian Tour wins (1)

Other wins (1)

Results in major championships

CUT = missed the half-way cut
"T" = tied

Summary

Most consecutive cuts made – 17 (1990 U.S. Open – 1994 PGA)
Longest streak of top-10s – 1 (three times)

Results in The Players Championship

CUT = missed the half-way cut
"T" indicates a tie for a place.

World Golf Championships

Wins (1)

Results timeline

1Cancelled due to 9/11

QF, R16, R32, R64 = Round in which player lost in match play
"T" = tied
NT = No Tournament

Team appearances
Amateur
Nomura Cup (representing Australia): 1985 (winners)

Professional
Four Tours World Championship (representing Australasia):: 1988, 1989, 1990 (winners), 1991
Alfred Dunhill Cup (representing Australia): 1991, 1993, 1995, 1998, 1999
Presidents Cup (International Team): 1994, 1996, 1998 (winners)
World Cup (representing Australia): 2002

References

External links

Australian male golfers
PGA Tour of Australasia golfers
European Tour golfers
Japan Golf Tour golfers
PGA Tour golfers
People educated at Melville Senior High School
People from Sunshine, Victoria
Golfers from Melbourne
Golfers from Sydney
Golfers from Orlando, Florida
1966 births
Living people